Elections for local government were held in Northern Ireland in 1989, with candidates contesting 565 seats.

Background
The elections took place after a turbulent period in Northern Irish politics. The signing of the Anglo-Irish Agreement (AIA) in November 1985 had been followed by widespread protests by those in the Unionist community. In November 1985, the 18 Unionist controlled District Councils voted for a policy of adjournment in protest against the AIA and in February 1986 also refused to set the 'rates' (local government taxes). In September 1986 Unionist councillors considered but rejected the option of mass resignations but decided to continue to use council chambers as a forum to protest the agreement.

One new development on the Unionist side was the entry into Northern Ireland politics of the Conservative Party which was joined by three sitting Unionist councillors.

On the Irish Republican side, the Irish Independence Party had disbanded following poor election results in 1985. Sinn Féin had split in 1986 over the issue of sitting in the Irish parliament, Dáil Éireann, if elected. The dissenting faction had formed Republican Sinn Féin (RSF). Three of the fifty nine councillors elected for Sinn Féin in 1985 joined this  grouping. The Remembrance Day bombing of 1987 had a negative impact on subsequent SF support. Irish Republicanism was also affected by the passing of the Elected Authorities (Northern Ireland) Act 1989 which disqualified candidates who refused to sign a declaration renouncing:

"(a) any organisation that is for the time being a proscribed organisation specified in Schedule 2 to the Northern Ireland (Emergency Provisions) Act 1978: or
(b) acts of terrorism (that is to say, violence for political ends) connected with the affairs of Northern Ireland"

RSF refused to sign the declaration and thus their twenty three candidates became ineligible.

Results

Overall

By council
The results were interpreted as "movement away from the extremes" with the UUP and SDLP increasing their lead over their rivals in the DUP and Sinn Féin respectively. A total of eleven councils saw the two top posts shared by parties from either side of the political/sectarian divide. The number of councils controlled by one party increased from two to six. The DUP retained control of Ballymena, with the UUP retained control of Banbridge and gained control of Antrim and Lisburn. The SDLP gained control of Down and Derry.

Antrim

Ards

Armagh

Ballymena

Ballymoney

Banbridge

Belfast

Carrickfergus

Castlereagh

Coleraine

Cookstown

Craigavon

Derry

Down

Dungannon

Fermanagh

Larne

Limavady

Lisburn

Magherafelt

Moyle

Newry and Mourne

Newtownabbey

North Down

Omagh

Strabane

References

 
1989
Local elections
1989 elections in Northern Ireland